Børge Minerth (2 April 1920 – 19 March 1980) was a Danish gymnast. He competed at the 1948 Summer Olympics and the 1952 Summer Olympics.

References

1920 births
1980 deaths
Danish male artistic gymnasts
Olympic gymnasts of Denmark
Gymnasts at the 1948 Summer Olympics
Gymnasts at the 1952 Summer Olympics
Sportspeople from Copenhagen